Plaza Aragón metro station is a station of the Mexico City Metro in the colonias (neighborhoods) of Ignacio Allende and Valle de Santiago, in Ecatepec de Morelos, State of Mexico, in the metropolitan area of Mexico City. It is an at-grade station with one island platform served by Line B (the Green-and-Gray Line), between Ciudad Azteca and Olímpica stations. The station was opened on 30 November 2000, on the first day of service between Ciudad Azteca and Buenavista metro stations. The facilities are accessible for people with disabilities as there are elevators, tactile pavings and braille signage plates. In 2019, Plaza Aragón metro station had an average daily ridership of 19,721 passengers, making it the tenth-most used on the line.

Location
Plaza Aragón is a metro station along Carlos Hank González Avenue (also known as Central Avenue), in Ecatepec de Morelos, State of Mexico, a neighboring municipality of Mexico City. The station serves the colonias (Mexican Spanish for "neighborhoods") of Ignacio Allende and Valle de Santiago. Within the system, the station lies between Ciudad Azteca and Olímpica metro stations.

Exits
There are two exits:
North: Carlos Hank González Avenue and Ignacio Zaragoza Street, Ignacio Allende.
South: Carlos Hank González Avenue and Cegor Avenue, Valle de Santiago.

History and construction
Line B of the Mexico City Metro was built by Empresas ICA; Plaza Aragón metro station opened on 30 November 2000, on the first day of the Ciudad Azteca–Buenavista service. The station is accessible for people with disabilities as there are elevators, tactile pavings and braille signage plates. The pedestrian bridges that connect the access to the station are adapted for bicycles as a bicycle lane was built in 2015 on the adjacent median strip.

Ridership
According to the data provided by the authorities since the 2000s, commuters have averaged per year between 19,300 and 21,600 daily entrances in the last decade. In 2019, before the impact of the COVID-19 pandemic on public transport, the station had a ridership of 7,198,356 passengers, which was a decrease of 229,729 passengers compared to 2018. In the same year, Plaza Aragón metro station was the 90th busiest station of the system's 195 stations, and it was the line's tenth-most used.

Notes

References

External links
 

2000 establishments in Mexico
Accessible Mexico City Metro stations
Ecatepec de Morelos
Mexico City Metro Line B stations
Mexico City Metro stations outside Mexico City
Railway stations opened in 2000